The Nakajima Ha1 Kotobuki (寿, "Longevity") was an aero-engine developed by Nakajima. It was a radial piston developed under licence from the Bristol Jupiter.

Design and development
In 1917, Chikuhei Nakajima set up the "Airplane Institute" at Ojima Town in Gunma Prefecture. In 1918 they built their first airplane; the "Nakajima Type 1" with a U.S.A. made engine. In 1920 the company sent Kimihei Nakajima to France to study European advances, and in 1922 started their own engine factory in Tokyo. This led to production of engines based on the Lawrance A-3 two-cylinder air-cooled horizontally opposed engine.

At the time the Lawrence was an oddity. Most air-cooled engines at that time were rotary engines using cylinders that rotated together with the propeller, but Kimihei overheard that an engine with good cooling capability with fixed cylinders was being developed in England. He observed the English Gloster Gamecock fighter with its Bristol Jupiter engine, which was an advanced design for the era  with an automatic adjustment device for tappet clearance, spiral piping for even intake distribution, and a four-valve intake and exhaust system. He acquired a manufacturing license for the Jupiter in 1925. In 1927, after inviting two production engineer instructors from the Bristol company, the  Jupiter Type 6 of 420 PS and Type 7 of 450 PS with a supercharger were put into production at the Nakajima factory.

After studying the Pratt & Whitney Wasp 9-cylinder radial, Nakajima tried to combine the good points found in Jupiter design with the rational design of the Wasp. Nakajima then produced a series of engine types, named "AA", "AB", "AC", and "AD", as engineering exercises. The next engine design, the "AE", was innovative, with a bore of 160 mm and a stroke of 170 mm.

Prototypes were made and performance tests were done, but this engine was not adopted due to its very complex engineering. Nakajima continued testing different cylinder designs. In 1929, the "AH" design, with bore and stroke of 146 × 160 mm and a total displacement of 24.1 L, was completed. This was to be the final version of this basic engine design.

In June 1930 the first prototype of was completed and it passed the durability test for the type approval in the summer. Then flight tests were started using a Nakajima A2N carrier plane. Nakajima had designed the first Japanese originally designed air-cooled 9-cylinder engine, the 450 PS "Kotobuki". In December 1931, this engine was approved and adopted by the Navy as the Ha-1 Ko  for the Type 97 carrier fighter. The engine was named, in connection with the Jupiter engine, "Kotobuki".

The "Kotobuki" engine was improved and developed into the "Hikari (light)" engine with the bore and stroke expanded to the limit of the cylinder (160 × 180 mm for a displacement of 32.6 L), with the power was increased to 720 PS. The "Hikari" was used in Type 95 carrier fighters and Type 96 Carrier Attack Plane.

In search of more power the basic design was extended into a 14-cylinder 2-row engine, the "Ha-5 Ha-41 Ha-109" series.

Variants
2-Kai-1 
2-Kai-3 
3-Kai 
Ha1
Ha1a
Ha1b

Applications
 Mitsubishi A5M
 Mitsubishi Ki-18
 Nakajima A1N2
 Nakajima A2N
 Nakajima Ki-8
 Nakajima Ki-27
 Nakajima E4N
 Nakajima E8N
 Nakajima Ki-34
 Nakajima Type 91

Specifications

See also
Nakajima Ha-5
 List of aircraft engines

References

Bibliography

Aircraft air-cooled radial piston engines
1930s aircraft piston engines
Nakajima aircraft engines